PONY League may refer to one of the following:

 Pennsylvania–Ontario–New York League, commonly abbreviated PONY League, a defunct baseball minor league renamed as New York–Penn League in 1957
 PONY Baseball and Softball, a youth sports organization formed in 1951 and based in the U.S. state of Pennsylvania
 Pony League, one of that organization's levels of play
 Pony League World Series, an annual tournament staged since 1952